Château de Belhade is a château in Landes, Nouvelle-Aquitaine, France. It dates to the 14th century and is built in a 13th-century style.

Châteaux in Landes (department)